Patricio Vidal may refer to:

Patricio Vidal López (born 1990), Chilean footballer
Patricio Vidal (Argentine footballer) (born 1992), Argentine footballer